The Manila International Auto Show is an annual venue for car buyers and enthusiasts alike to take a closer look at the latest models and significant concepts from the Philippines’ premiere auto makers. It is the Philippines’ biggest motor show in terms of visitor count, cars on display, and exhibitors. The show was previously known as The Manila International Motor Show,

History of the Manila International Auto Show

In 2005, motoring writers Jason K. Ang, Ulysses K. Ang, and Alvin Uy approached Joseph Ang, a founding chairman of Worldbex Services International to talk about the idea of an international grade and industry-based auto show in the Philippines. Joseph Ang, who was familiar with organizing events and tradeshows thanks to his experience in organizing highly successful expositions, accepted the challenge and announced the founding of the first ever Manila Motor Show held April 2005. He dedicated it as a tribute to his late father, who, before his passing, was involved in the automotive industry as a car dealer.

In 2006, the MANILA INTERNATIONAL AUTO SHOW was presented by the Chamber of Automotive Manufacturers of the Philippines Inc. (CAMPI) and legitimate establishments and partners in the automotive car industry and ever since, has held annual motor shows that showcased the latest models and automotive technologies the automotive industry had to offer.

MIAS 2022
On the 17th year, the Manila International Auto Show took place on April 7–10, 2022 at World Trade Center Metro Manila (themed "Setting Gears in Motion"). 
The new cars launched during this event included: Changan CS35 Facelift, Chery Tiggo 5X Pro and Tiggo 8 Pro, Chevrolet Tahoe, the new and improved Foton Thunder Manual Transmission, the updated GAC GS8, MG HS, Nissan Navara Calibre-X, Peugeot 2008 and Traveller, and last but not the least the Facelifted Subaru Forester and the all-new BRZ. This Event also previewed the GAC's first sport sedan, which is the EMPOW55.

MIAS Wired 2020
The 16th year of the Manila International Auto Show became Online as the country facing the COVID-19 Pandemic. MIAS Wired took place on December 16–20, 2020 (themed "Shifting Gears Virtually") through their website and social media platforms. This edition of MIAS makes the debut of Changan Cars in the country, and many local car manufacturers participated in this Event.

MIAS 2019
On the 15th year, the Manila International Auto Show took place on April 4–7, 2019 at World Trade Center Metro Manila (themed "Experience Fun & Function"). A variety of local car manufacturers showcased new models this year, including Mitsubishi, Nissan, the relaunched Kia Philippines, Volkswagen, Chevrolet, MG, Ford, and Suzuki. In addition to this, the event's extensive aftermarket section as well as its modified and classic car displays will be present.

MIAS 2018
In its 14th year on April 5 to 8, 2018 at the WTC, the Manila International Auto Show (themed "Work & Play") featured: Chevrolet Malibu, Hyundai Kona, Ioniq Hybrid, all-new Veloster and all-new Santa Fe, Ford Mustang and Expedition, Subaru Eysight, BMW M2 and M1, Isuzu MU-X RZ4E, Suzuki Dzire, JAC Cars, and more. Plus, die-cast miniature display, beautiful models, Russ Swift Stunt Show, test drive your favorite cars, and more activities in MIAS 2018

MIAS 2017
After 13 years since its inauguration, the 13th Manila International Auto Show (with the theme, "Beyond Performance") was held from March 30 to April 2, 2018, and participated by car brands such as Chevrolet, Ford, Hyundai, Honda, Mazda, Mitsubishi, Subaru and many more.

MIAS 2016
In 2016, the most mobility together with the 12th Manila International Auto Show the themed "Smart Mobility" was not short on new car launches. This year, we saw new cars from Chevrolet, Hyundai, Mitsubishi, Ford and Subaru. 2016 also marks the return of SsangYong in the Philippines. As with every MIAS event, there were aftermarket parts, custom and classic cars on display. Plus, die-cast miniature display, hot models, Russ Swift Stunt Show, test drive your favorite cars, and more activities.

MIAS 2015
The 2015 MIAS. The show itself was capable of gathering a crowd of more than 110,000 visitors along with participants in hundreds of number from all over the globe, inside the 30,000 sqm World Trade Center hall.

The major launches received by the 2015 MIAS included cars like the new Ford Mustang, 5 Door Mini Cooper, Mazda MX-5, Subaru Legacy and Outback, Ford Everest, Mazda 2,  Kia Sorento, and a lot more. The auto show included activities such as the Russ Swift Stunt Show, die-cast miniature display. Various customized, classic, and tuner car exhibitions were also present at MIAS 2015.

MIAS 2014
The 10th Manila International Auto Show was held from April 3 to April 6, 2014, at World Trade Center Metro Manila. The show is similar to India's Auto Expo that took place in February 2014. This year saw the introduction of the Subaru WRX and WRX STI, the arrival of Tata Motors in the Philippine market with the Manza sedan, the Vista hatchback/MPV, the Xenon pick-up as well as the Ace and Super Ace compact commercial trucks. Volkswagen Philippines launched new models, including the Jetta, Polo, Tiguan, Touran and Touareg. Ford Philippines also launched the all-new Ford Ecosport. It also came as a surprise to many who visited the Ford booth when they had a 2014 Ford Escape on display, coming as an import from the US. The Chinese automaker BYD  debuted the BYD L3, BYD F5 Surui, and the BYD S6. Some other brands and models included the Kia Soul, Jeep Cherokee, Rolls-Royce. There were also other exhibitions, including classic cars, customized cars, bikes, and trucks, in addition to the Russ Swift Stunt Show and Subaru Vehicles.

MIAS 2013
On the 9th year of Manila International Auto Show on April 4–7, 2013 at World Trade Center Metro Manila, Held by Worldbex Services International annually, the theme of this year's MIAS is Innovation and Technology, and is dubbed as the country's biggest driving and motoring event.

Headlining the event will once again be Russ Swift, as he wows the crowds in attendance with his precision stunt driving skills and showmanship. Ford will be showcasing the capabilities of the Ranger Wildtrak in a 4x4 demonstration.

The Car Awards Group, Inc., the prestigious association of Philippine motoring journalists, will reveal the next vehicle to be crowned as the 2012-2013 Car Of The Year Philippines.

Russ Swift Stunt Show precision driver and the Subaru vehicles, die-cast miniature display, sponsors of automotive selections and more exhibitions.

MIAS 2012
The Manila International Auto Show 2012, now in its 8th year, was held last March 29 to April 1 at the World Trade Center and was undoubtedly the biggest and most anticipated event for car enthusiasts. 400 cars on display including the newest sports cars from different brands, the best concept cars, hybrid cars, and a lot more were showcased to the over 88,600 people who attended.

MIAS 2011
Watch out for the 7th Manila International Auto Show (MIAS) from April 7 to 10, 2011 at the World Trade Center Metro Manila and its East Wing annex tent building and Philippine Trade Training Center (PTTC) building. Now with a total indoor and outdoor exhibition space of about 23,000 square meters, the show promises to be more exciting than the last. MIAS aims to boost industry sales beyond its previous performance with a well-attended selling event, given an unparalleled track record of 6 consecutive years of automotive exhibition excellence.

MIAS 2010
The sixth annual edition of the Manila International Auto Show (MIAS) on April 15–18, 2010. Can proved to be a smashing success, with more than 78,000 visitors trooping to the World Trade Center. Visitors viewed more than 200 cars on display at the WTC Main Hall; there were also more than 80 restored classic and modified cars on display at the airconditioned tent annex—most of these participated in the MIAS Custom and Classic Car Competition.

MIAS 2009: Passion for Performance
Manila International Auto Show 2009 show was held over nearly 20,000 square meters of indoor and outdoor areas. MIAS welcomed more than 70,000 visitors during its April 2 to 5, 2009 run. They viewed 35 car brands from seven countries, including some vehicles never before seen on Philippine roads.

Motor Image Pilipinas, the exclusive Philippine distributor of Subaru automobiles, launched the new Impreza sedan.

MIAS continued its tradition of showcasing new products and new cars. Five auto brands from China unveiled their new models: the Chana Starlight Jr. (a subcompact version of the Chana Starlight); Chery QQ3, QQ1.1 AMT, QQ6, Tiggo 1.6 MT and a bullet-proof Tiggo Concept; Lifan 520; Great Wall Peri; Foton MPX.

EVnnovations previewed its REVAi electric vehicle. The REVAi is a full-electric vehicle, running on lead-acid batteries. After an 8-hour charge from home or office 220-volt electrical outlet, the REVAi is ready to run for up to 80 kilometers, with a top speed of 80 km/h.

MD Juan showcased its Philippine-made e-Jeepney. The e-Jeepney is an electrically powered, zero-emissions vehicle that provides an alternative to the noisy, uncomfortable, and smoke-belching jeeps that we often see on Philippine roads.

The MIAS Custom Classic Car Competition held its second year, with more than sixty cars participating in a gleaming showcase of classic and custom vehicles. Taking the best of show was a pristine 1956 Pontiac Star Chief.

The European Mobile Media Association (EMMA) conducted a Sound competition at the MIAS grounds.

Mercedes-Benz showed off the all-new GLK SUV, BMW exhibited a rarely seen 6-Series convertible. Jeep displayed a toughened-up variant of the Wrangler. Jaguar introduced the new XF sedan. Mitsubishi previewed the new Galant and displayed the new Montero Sport 4x2 and Evolution X models. Honda showed off the new City.

Several OEM and aftermarket suppliers also graced MIAS. Bridgestone set up a motorsports-themed pavilion. Yokohama showed off a classic Alfa Romeo in its area. Motolite celebrated its 90th anniversary with an impressive display. AutoPlus Sportzentrium, distributor of Motul high-performance lubricants, displayed a gaggle of super cars in its area, including a Nissan R35 GT-R paired with a tuned R34. Also in their booth was a Ford GT, a Shelby GT-500, and several rare Porsches. Tuason Racing gave a series of seminars on road safety. Repsol also highlighted its line of lubricants.

Summit Media's BBC Top Gear Philippines was the event's exclusive magazine sponsor.

MIAS 2008: Imagination in Motion
The 2008 show was held from 3 to 6 April at the World Trade Center, Roxas Boulevard, Pasay. MIAS 2008 covered over 20,000 square meters of exhibition space—making it the biggest motoring event this country has ever seen. MIAS 2008 attracted 76,800 visitors (not including the exhibitors and their employees and associates).

As the only major motoring event for the first half of 2008, MIAS 2008 continues to be the venue of choice for launching new cars.  This year, no less than 15 new models will make their public debut including several new car brands.

Seeing the growing trend towards cars as rolling works of art, MIAS takes the theme of “Imagination in Motion.”

Manila International Auto Show 2008 presented a total of 26 brands including Autohub, BMW, Chana, Chery, Chevrolet, Chrysler, Dodge, FAW, Ferrari, Ford, Honda, Hyundai, Isuzu, JAC, Jaguar, Jeep, Kama Trucks, Land Rover, Maserati, Mazda, Mercedes-Benz, Mitsubishi, Nissan, Sinski, Ssangyong, Subaru and Suzuki.  Other notable exhibitors were Bridgestone, Michelin, Yokohama, Philippine Aluminum Wheels Inc. (Rota), and Autoplus (Motul Oil).

Summit Media's BBC Top Gear Philippines was a sponsor and primary media partner.

MIAS 2007: Modern Mobility
The 2007 show was held from 29 March to 1 April at the World Trade Center, Roxas Boulevard, Pasay. MIAS 2007 attracted 68,000 visitors (not including the exhibitors and their employees and associates). Approximately 250 cars were on display within the WTC main hall and lobby.

Manila International Auto Show 2007 presented a total of 21 brands including BMW, Chevrolet, Chrysler, Dodge, Ferrari, Ford, Honda, Hyundai, Isuzu, JAC, Jaguar, Jeep, Kama Trucks, Land Rover, Maserati, Mazda, Mercedes-Benz, Mitsubishi, Nissan, Subaru and Suzuki.  Notably absent in the commercial exhibits this year was the country's biggest automotive brand Toyota, as were Audi, Porsche, Kia and Volvo. Summit Media's BBC Top Gear Philippines was a sponsor and primary media partner.

Highlights of the show included:

Mazda Wins the Best Exhibition Booth Award 
The Mazda Pavilion was chosen as “Best Exhibition Booth” this year because of overall design, difficulty in execution, architectural balance and harmony, adherence to its corporate identity and concept. The Mazda team received the award given to them during the third day of the show. A big photowall served as backdrop for its models and invokes the youthful lifestyle of the brand.

Ford Group Philippines has the biggest outdoor and indoor exhibition space 
With a total of 400 square meters of interior showcase and over 2,000 square meters of outdoor space consisting of a specially designed outdoor 4x4 circuit track, Ford has the biggest combined outdoor and indoor showcase in the recently concluded Manila International Auto Show.  Visitors queuing up for their turn in test driving their favorite Ford SUV and pick-up trucks. A specially modified Ford Focus was also prominently displayed in their indoor exhibition together with some other models fitted with aftermarket body kits and alloy wheels.

Hyundai puts out the biggest indoor single brand showcase 
With a total of 611 square meters, Hyundai has the biggest indoor showcase exhibition.  Special space frame trusses were hoisted over their exhibition area that came with a plethora of halogen spot and flood lights illuminating its various models.  Several photographic walls served as backdrops for its various models.

Formula Motorsports Philippines came out with the most exotic showcase
Combining a mixed brand of 3 Ferraris, 4 Jaguar saloons and 3 luxury Range Rover SUV's made Formula Motorsports Philippines came out with the most exotic showcase in the recently concluded show.

Hyundai wins the best presentation award
With the public debut of its Veracruz, Elentra and Coupe, an oriental inspired dance number coupled with a professional singer was a big hit with the media who voted this presentation as the best among all the presentations made during the show. Several other exhibitors did their best to create a festive and lively atmosphere with lights and sound effects that made judging a tough choice to make.

Guinness World Record Holder Russ Swifts wows the MIAS crowd
Subaru used 3 high performance sedans to be used in a series of precision stunt driving performances by Guinness Record Holder Russ Swift, who performed two-wheel, donut spin and the thrilling fist-tight parallel parking maneuvers at the backstage area of the World Trade Center. The world-famous British stunt driver was behind the famous stunt scenes of the movie “The Italian Job” and is a regular performer in the most prestigious international auto shows in the world.

Motul Nismo Skyline GT-R in Manila
A Nissan Skyline GT-R R34 was specially imported for the MIAS exhibit by Autoplus Sportszentrum, the country's exclusive distributor for Motul Oil. The red Number 22 Motul-Pitwork Skyline GT-R was driven by Masami Kageyama and Richard Lyons in 2003 and won many victories in the fiercely competitive Japan Grand Touring Car Championship. The name Godzilla is appropriate, as it is accorded in Japan a demigod-like cult status, and was on loan courtesy of Nismo (Nissan Motorsports) Japan. Displayed beside the Godzilla was another Nissan Skyline owned by Autoplus. The highly modified blue colored Skyline GT-R was the country's first car to break the  record.

MIAS 2006: Driving our Future
In 2006, the show ran from April 6 to April 9 at the World Trade Center, Roxas Boulevard, Pasay.  The 2006 show marked a much larger show with these major exhibitors: Audi, BMW, Chevrolet, Chrysler, Dodge, Ferrari, Ford, Honda, Hyundai, Isuzu, Jaguar, Jeep, Kia Motors, Maserati, Mazda, Mercedes-Benz, Mitsubishi, Nissan, Porsche, and Toyota.  Aside from static displays, numerous test drives were available.

Car launches included 8th generation Honda Civic,  the Jeep Commander, the Chrysler Pacifica luxury wagon, the new Toyota Previa, the  Nissan Murano,  the new Kia Rio sedan and hatchback, and the new Hyundai Santa Fe SUV.

The exhibitors announced an amazing array of special vehicles and never-before seen road cars.  Mitsubishi Motor Philippines displayed their rally heritage with the Dakar-winning Pajero Evolution plus the Lancer Evolution IX MR and the Eclipse 3.8 V6.  Ford Group Philippines flexed their compact car muscle with their  Focus ST and Focus DuraTorq diesel.  Mercedes-Benz previewed the future of motoring with demos of the F-Cell hydrogen-powered fuel cell car, as Isuzu demonstrated its Elf Hybrid truck.  Toyota's TF105 Formula One race car represented the company's motorsports ambitions.  The evocative  Motul Ford GT was certainly another crowd drawer.

The theme for 2006 focused on alternative fuels and energy efficiency. In the midst of rising fossil fuel costs, a lot of car manufacturers are gearing their R&D efforts towards this direction.  Among the vehicles to be put on display is DaimlerChrysler’s Mercedes-Benz Fuel Cell car cleverly mounted within a standard A-Class chassis. Also on display is an Isuzu Elf Hybrid truck.  The Elf hybrid expands the possibilities for Isuzu's diesel technology, and brings it to new levels of efficiency and clean emissions. Both Mercedes-Benz and Isuzu conducted symposia on fuel-cell and hybrid technology during the show.

References

External links 
 
2022 show feature from AutoIndustriya.com. Auto Show feature on AutoIndustriya.com
2018 show feature from AutoIndustriya.com. Auto Show feature on AutoIndustriya.com
2014 show feature from AutoIndustriya.com. Auto Show feature on AutoIndustriya.com
2013 show feature from AutoIndustriya.com. Auto Show feature on AutoIndustriya.com
2012 show feature from AutoIndustriya.com. Auto Show feature on AutoIndustriya.com
2011 show feature from AutoIndustriya.com. Auto Show feature on AutoIndustriya.com
2010 show feature from AutoIndustriya.com. Auto Show feature on AutoIndustriya.com
2009 show feature from AutoIndustriya.com. Auto Show feature on AutoIndustriya.com
2008 show feature from AutoIndustriya.com. Auto Show feature on AutoIndustriya.com
2007 show feature from AutoIndustriya.com. Auto Show feature on AutoIndustriya.com
2006 show feature from AutoIndustriya.com. Auto Show feature on AutoIndustriya.com
2008 show feature from motioncars.com .
2007 show feature from motioncars.com .

Auto shows in the Philippines
Events in Metro Manila
Culture in Manila
Tourist attractions in Manila